Laveaga Peak is a mountain located in the Diablo Range in California. The peak is on the boundary between Merced County and San Benito County and is the highest point in Merced County. The mountain is high enough to receive some snowfall during winter.

References

External links 
 

Mountains of Merced County, California
Mountains of San Benito County, California
Diablo Range
Mountains of Northern California